Lee Roy Parnell is the self-titled debut album of American country music singer Lee Roy Parnell. It was released in 1990 via Arista Records. The album includes the singles "Crocodile Tears", "Oughta Be a Law" and "Family Tree". Although all three singles charted on the U.S. Billboard country charts, they all missed Top 40. "Mexican Money" was also made into a music video.

Brian Mansfield of Allmusic rated the album four stars out of five, praising Barry Beckett's production.

Track listing
"Oughta Be a Law" (Gary Nicholson, Dan Penn) – 4:18
"Fifty-Fifty Love" (Nicholson, Lee Roy Parnell) – 4:26
"Where Is My Baby Tonight" (Troy Seals, Graham Lyle) – 3:35
"Crocodile Tears" (Parnell, Leroy Preston) – 4:02
"Family Tree" (Steve Durocher, Jeannie Smith) – 3:06
"Let's Pretend" (Parnell, Cris Moore) – 4:10
"You're Taking Too Long" (Parnell, Nicholson, Rory Michael Bourke) – 5:14
"Mexican Money" (Parnell, Moore) – 3:03
"Down Deep" (Parnell, Nicholson, Bucky Jones) – 3:59
"Red Hot" (Parnell, Moore) – 3:30

Personnel
As listed in liner notes.

Musicians
 Barry Beckett – keyboards
 John Gardner – drums
 Jim Horn, Michael Haynes, Jack Hale, Quitman Dennis – horn section
 Bill Hullett – acoustic guitar, electric guitar
 Tim Loftin – bass guitar
 Joe McGlohon – saxophone
 Jonell Mosser – background vocals
 Lee Roy Parnell – acoustic guitar, electric guitar, slide guitar, lead vocals
 Harry Stinson – background vocals
 Bergen White – background vocals
 John Willis – acoustic guitar
 Dennis Wilson – background vocals
 Glenn Worf – bass guitar

Production
 Barry Beckett – producer
 Scott Hendricks – mixing
 Denny Purcell – mastering

References

1990 debut albums
Albums produced by Barry Beckett
Lee Roy Parnell albums
Arista Records albums